Purranque is a city in the Chilean Los Lagos Region, which lies on the Pan-American Highway about  north of Puerto Montt. It is part of the Osorno Province.

History
The first ethnically identifiable inhabitants of the area were Huilliches, an indigenous people, and the land belonged to Cacique (Chief) Raylef, who was known as "Cacique Don Raylef de Purranquil"; Purranquil meaning in Mapudungun language “bush land”. 

On November 24, 1941 the town was elevated to the category of city by law 6402.

Tourism
The city is served by Canal Bajo Carlos Hott Siebert Airport, located near Osorno, and the El Tepual International Airport, located near Puerto Montt.

Demographics
Of these, 13,265 (64.1%) lived in urban areas and 7,440 (35.9%) in rural areas. The population grew by 2.6% (529 persons) between the 1992 and 2002 censuses.

Administration
As a commune, Purranque is a third-level administrative division of Chile administered by a municipal council, headed by an alcalde who is directly elected every four years. The 2008-2012 alcalde is César Negrón Schwerter (PS).

Within the electoral divisions of Chile, Purranque is represented in the Chamber of Deputies by Fidel Espinoza (PS) and Carlos Recondo (UDI) as part of the 56th electoral district, together with Puyehue, Río Negro, Puerto Octay, Fresia, Frutillar, Llanquihue, Puerto Varas and Los Muermos. The commune is represented in the Senate by Camilo Escalona Medina (PS) and Carlos Kuschel Silva (RN) as part of the 17th senatorial constituency (Los Lagos Region).

Education
Previously the area had a German school, Deutsche Schule Purranque.

See also
Osorno Volcano
Osorno Province
Tomás Burgos
Héctor Mancilla

References

External links
Municipality of Purranque (Official city webpage) 
Diario Austral de Osorno (newspaper of the area) 
Tourist information about the city 

Communes of Chile
Populated places established in 1911
Populated places in Osorno Province
1911 establishments in Chile